The Langevin family is a French family with some prominent scientists. French psychiatrist Philippe Pinel, and French physicist Paul Langevin, both members of the French Academy of Sciences, are the most prominent members.

Genealogy 

 Philippe Pinel (1745–1826), psychiatrist
 Louis Pinel, French soldier and Chinese general, son of Léon Pinel, grand-nephew of Philippe Pinel
  Marie-Adélaïde Pinel, teacher, daughter of Léon Pinel, grand-niece of Philippe Pinel x Victor-Charles Langevin, son of Joseph Langevin and Marie-Louise Maillet 
 Victor Langevin
 Julien Langevin, wine salesman
 Paul Langevin (1872–1946), physicist, teacher at Collège de France x Jeanne Desfosses, whose nephew was producer Pierre Bourgeois
 Jean Langevin (1899–1979), physicist x Edwige Vige Grandjouan, artist and teacher, daughter of Jules Grandjouan (1875–1968), artist, journalist, activist
 Bernard Tiapa Langevin, mountain guide x Claire Chavannes, daughter of Fernand Chavannes and granddaughter of Édouard Chavannes (1865–1918), archeologist and sinologist, then X Annette Mirel, sociologist
 Rémi Langevin (born 1950), mathematician, topologist, geometer
  Fanny Langevin, chemical engineer 
  Sylvestre Sylvio Langevin, naval architect x Annick Balaresque, artist
 Églantine Langevin
  Erwan Langevin
  Noémie Koechlin, born Langevin, biologist x Yves Koechlin, physicist, son of Charles Koechlin (1867–1950), composer
 Marianne Koechlin, ceramist
  Laurent Koechlin, astrophysicist
 André Langevin (1901–1977), physicist x Luce Langevin (1899–2002), physicist, teacher, activist
 Aline Langevin, english teacher x Roger Dajoz, biologist
 Hélène Dajoz, mathematics teacher
  Isabelle Dajoz, biologist
  Michel Langevin (1926–1985), physicist, activist x Hélène Langevin-Joliot, physicist, daughter of Frederic Joliot (1900–1958), physicist, and Irene Curie (1897–1956), physicist
 Françoise Langevin
  Yves Langevin (born 1951), astrophysicist
 Madeleine Langevin (1902–1977) x Albert Varloteau, ceramist and unionist
  Jacques Varloteau, teacher x Béatrice Thuillier 
 Claire Varloteau
 Lise Varloteau
  Anne Varloteau
  Hélène Solomon-Langevin (1909–1995), deputy, resistant x Jacques Solomon (1908–1942), physicist, then x André Parreaux, historian
  Paul Langevin x Eliane Montel (1898–1992), physicist
  Paul-Gilbert Langevin (1933–1986), musicologist x Anne-Marie Desbat (1941–2016), physics teacher
 Paul-Éric Langevin (born 1979), linguist and transcriber
  Isabelle Langevin (born 1983), physiotherapist

Langevin family tree

See also 
 Curie family
 Koechlin family

Photographs

External links 
 
  (translated by J. B. Sykes, 1973 from the original French: "L'évolution de l'espace et du temps").
 Wolfram research biographical entry by Michel Barran.
 
 
 Charles Coulston Gillispie, Dictionary of scientific biography, Vol. 8, biography written by Francis Perrin, New York, Scribner's sons, 1973.
 Family of Paul Langevin, during the funeral, listening to Education minister Marcel Naegelen's talk, 21 December 1946 in France.
 Family of Paul Langevin, Maurice Thorez and Jacques Duclos, during the funeral, 21 December 1946 in France.

 
French families
Scientific families